The concept of the Scottish Noblesse, a class of nobles of either peerage or non-peerage rank, was prominently advocated for by Sir Thomas Innes of Learney during his tenure as an officer of arms. Innes of Learney believed that Scottish armigers, those individuals granted arms by the Court of the Lord Lyon, implicitly become 'Nobles in the Noblesse of Scotland': a form of hereditary nobility.  The soundness of the basis for this belief is uncertain, and included drawing on historical English practice, and the belief that, because other officers of the Crown had been delegated the power to ennoble historically, the Lord Lyon should be able to as well. Despite relying heavily on historical documentation in England, he simultaneously also opposed the application of English heraldic practice and law as it related to heraldry in Scotland. 

In 2018, the Lord Lyon quietly dropped the so-called nobility clause from newly issued Letters Patent.

See also
 Peerage of Scotland
 Barons in Scotland
 Laird

References

Medieval Scottish nobility
Scottish culture